James Arthur Baird (November 2, 1877 – July 26, 1964) was an American football and baseball player, track athlete, coach of football, basketball, and baseball, college athletics administrator, lawyer, and Hancock County, Illinois judge.

Biography
Baird was born on November 2, 1877 in Ferris, Illinois to Alexander Baird (1851–1916) and Allie May Moore (1853–1942). He graduated from Carthage College in 1900 and was the first athlete to letter in three sports in one season.

He next enrolled at Northwestern University School of Law and played college football there from 1900 to 1902. He played at the guard and center positions and also handled kicking for Northwestern. He was also a member of the Northwestern track team, competing in the pole vault and high jump, and was selected in June 1903 as captain of the track team.

He served as the head football coach at Carleton College from 1903 to 1905. He served as the head football coach at Whitman College from 1906 to 1907.

From 1908 to 1915, Baird served as the head football coach at Carthage College. He was also the head basketball coach at Carthage from 1906 to 1914 and the head baseball coach there from 1910 to 1914.

On June 23, 1913, Baird married Georgia Hubbs in New York. She died in 1917.

Baird was elected as a Hancock County, Illinois judge in 1910 and served to 1914. When asked about the continuation of town meetings, he described them as: "not as effective as in olden times, but still stands ready to render us a service." He served a single term, and then returned to his private law practice. He was elected for a second four-year term in 1934 and he was re-elected in 1938, 1942, and in 1946. Baird retired from the bench when his final term expired in 1950.

Baird died on July 26, 1964 in Galesburg, Illinois. He was buried next to his wife.

Head coaching record

Football

References

External links
 
 

1877 births
1964 deaths
19th-century players of American football
American football guards
Carleton Knights football coaches
Carthage Firebirds athletic directors
Carthage Firebirds baseball coaches
Carthage Firebirds men's basketball coaches
Carthage Firebirds football coaches
Carthage Firebirds football players
Northwestern Wildcats baseball players
Northwestern Wildcats football players
Whitman Fighting Missionaries football coaches
Northwestern Wildcats men's track and field athletes
Northwestern University Pritzker School of Law alumni
Illinois lawyers
People from Hancock County, Illinois